Archduchess Maria Clementina Franziska Josepha of Austria (1 March 1798 – 3 September 1881) was Princess of Salerno by marriage to the Sicilian prince Leopold, Prince of Salerno. She was born an Archduchess of Austria as the daughter of Francis II, Holy Roman Emperor, and Maria Theresa of Naples and Sicily.

Biography

Early life 
Born at the Hofburg Palace in Vienna on 1 March 1798, Clementina was the third surviving daughter of Francis II, Holy Roman Emperor, later Emperor Francis I of Austria after the dissolution of the Holy Roman Empire, and his wife Maria Theresa of Naples and Sicily.

Maria Clementina was a younger sister of Marie Louise, Empress of the French, Emperor Ferdinand I of Austria, and Maria Leopoldina, Empress of Brazil. She was also an older sister of Marie Caroline, Crown Princess of Saxony, Archduke Franz Karl of Austria, and Archduchess Maria Anna of Austria.

Marriage 

Maria Clementina married her mother’s younger brother,  Prince Leopoldo of the Two Sicilies, Prince of Salerno, on 28 July 1816 at the Schönbrunn Palace in Vienna. He was the youngest son of King Ferdinand I of the Two Sicilies and Archduchess Maria Carolina of Austria.

From their four children, only a daughter survived to adulthood, Princess Maria Carolina of the Two Sicilies, who on 25 November 1844, in Naples, married her paternal first cousin Prince Henri, Duke of Aumale. Henri was the fourth (and second-youngest) surviving son of King Louis-Philippe of France and his wife Princess Maria Amalia of Naples and Sicily.

Through their daughter, Clementina and Leopoldo had seven grandchildren, two of whom reached adulthood. However, neither of these grandchildren married or produced children of their own.

Death 
Maria Clementina died on 3 September 1881 at the Château de Chantilly, France, the home of her widowed son-in-law Duke Henri. She was eighty-three years old; all her descendants having predeceased her. She was buried at the Royal Chapel, Dreux, France.

Issue and family

Stillborn daughter* (16 September 1819)
Princess Maria Carolina Augusta of the Two Sicilies (26 April 1822 – 6 December 1869); married Prince Henri, Duke of Aumale, and had issue.
Prince Lodovico Carlo of the Two Sicilies (19 July 1824 – 7 August 1824); died in infancy.
Stillborn daughter* (5 February 1829)

Honours
  : Dame of the Order of the Starry Cross.
  : Dame of the Order of Queen Maria Luisa.

Ancestry

References

External links

 Archive letters from Maria Clementina to her sister Marie Louise

1798 births
1881 deaths
House of Habsburg
Austrian princesses
House of Bourbon-Two Sicilies
Knights of the Order of Saint Stephen of Hungary
Burials at the Chapelle royale de Dreux
Austrian Roman Catholics
18th-century Roman Catholics
19th-century Roman Catholics
Nobility from Vienna
Daughters of emperors
Children of Francis II, Holy Roman Emperor
Daughters of kings